The American Cinema Editors Award for Best Edited Animation – (Non-Theatrical) is one of the annual awards given by the American Cinema Editors. The award was first presented at the 2021 ceremony.

Winners and nominees

2020s

References

External links
 

American Cinema Editors Awards